Janine Turner (born Janine Loraine Gauntt; December 6, 1962) is an American actress best known for her roles as Maggie O'Connell in the television series Northern Exposure, as Jessie Deighan in the feature film Cliffhanger, and as Katie McCoy in Friday Night Lights. She is an author, public speaker and founder and co-chair of Constituting America 2010.

Early life
Turner was born Janine Loraine Gauntt in Lincoln, Nebraska, the daughter of Janice Loraine (née Agee) and Turner Maurice Gauntt Jr. Her parents returned to their native Texas soon after her birth, and Turner grew up in Euless and Fort Worth, Texas.

Career
In 1978, the 15-year-old Turner left home to pursue a modeling career with the Wilhelmina Modeling Agency in New York City. She began her acting career in 1980 in Hollywood, appearing in several episodes of Dallas.  In October 1981 Turner could be seen in a television commercial for Buf-Puf body sponge.  She continued to make guest appearances on television shows throughout the 1980s before landing the role of Laura Templeton on General Hospital.

By 1986, Turner had become frustrated by the quality of the roles she was getting. As she told the Chicago Tribune five years later, "I was always working, but I wanted to do more serious roles and knew that I had the talent. I had to get away from Hollywood." Disregarding her agent's advice, Turner moved to New York in order to hone her craft, studying in Manhattan with Marcia Haufrecht of the Actors Studio.
I gained a new respect and appreciation for acting in New York. And I decided that I didn't want to lock myself into roles that portrayed women negatively. I turned a lot of (TV and film) opportunities down because of that. Everyone thought I was crazy. I was really going for broke. I only had eight dollars left and had become very depressed right before I got the part in Northern Exposure.

 Cast as Maggie O'Connell in 1990, Turner's work on Northern Exposure would earn her an Emmy nomination in 1993 and three consecutive Golden Globe nominations from 1992 to 1994. Accolades aside, the role itself was a positive experience for Turner, following the "damsel in distress" roles that had all but driven her from Hollywood in the first place. "I've found my ideal character in Maggie," she told the Tribune. "She's smarter and stronger than all the men she meets." Turner's own move from Hollywood to New York was mirrored by Maggie's, from her affluent Grosse Pointe community to the remote fictional backwater of Cicely, Alaska. Turner said about Maggie that "She went against the grain and challenged herself by moving to Alaska."

After her breakthrough in Northern Exposure, Turner appeared in the action film Cliffhanger opposite Sylvester Stallone. She next appeared as June Cleaver in a Leave It to Beaver film adaptation of television's original Leave it to Beaver, then in Stolen Women: Captured Hearts, and Dr. T & the Women with Richard Gere. She also appeared in No Regrets and numerous movies of the week.

In 2004, Turner wrote, produced, and directed the award-winning Trip in a Summer Dress, a film about a strong-willed mother and her children. In 2006, she appeared in a low-budget movie filmed in Dallas, The Night of the White Pants, with Tom Wilkinson. In 2007, she co-wrote, co-produced, and starred in Christoga, a Christian Yoga DVD, Turner also co-wrote and produced an album, Mockingbird Hill, in which both she and her daughter Juliette sang.

In 2008, Turner began a 12-episode run on the NBC television series Friday Night Lights. She portrayed Katie McCoy, mother of a talented high school football quarterback.

In 2015, Turner portrayed the wife of Anthony Hopkins' character in Solace.

In 2010 Turner founded and is the co-president of the organization Constituting America with co-president Cathy Gillespie, aimed at educating American adults and students about the non-partisan relevancy of the U.S. Constitution.

On May 21, 2011, Turner began hosting a live two-hour talk show, The Janine Turner Show, on talk radio station KLIF (AM) in Dallas, and in Houston, KPRC (AM), followed by iHeart Radio until 2013. It was awarded "Best Radio Show in Dallas".

Turner is the author of four books, Holding Her Head High: Inspiration from 12 Single Mothers Who Championed Their Children and Changed History,A Little Bit Vulnerable: On Hollywood, God, Sobriety, & Politics, Wisdom For Each Day: Inherited From My Great Grandfather, and Artificial Intelligentsia Vs. Primal Sense. Holding Her Head High focuses on single mothers through history, such as Rachel Lavein Fawcett, the abandoned single mother of Alexander Hamilton.

Activism and advocacy
In 2006, Turner was appointed a member of the President's Council on Service and Civic Participation. 
In 2010, Turner launched her public speaking career on the national circuit and became a sought-after public inspirational speaker on a plethora of topics, including heart health, sobriety, faith, the Constitution, and politics. She speaks at corporate events, civic events, schools, universities, and churches.

Turner has described herself as "socially liberal and fiscally conservative. I'm almost more libertarian." Turner has written 85 essays on the 85 Federalist Papers, and many op-ed pieces for the Washington Examiner, The Washington Times, and FoxNews.com. Turner has written a petition, "The Truth Act" – and corresponding white paper, "Long and Little Known: How Incoherent Statutes Harm Liberty & the Rule of Law".

Personal life

Turner has never married. Her daughter, Juliette Turner-Jones, was born in 1997. Juliette legally hyphenated her surname in 2006 to include the name of her father, Jerry Jones Jr., son of the Dallas Cowboys' owner. Turner was once engaged to Alec Baldwin and also dated Troy Aikman, Mikhail Baryshnikov, and Sylvester Stallone. As of 2014, Turner was living on a longhorn cattle ranch outside Dallas with her daughter.

Filmography

Film

Television

Awards and nominations
Emmy Award
 1993: Nominated, "Outstanding Lead Actress in a Drama Series" – Northern Exposure

Golden Globe Award
 1992: Nominated, "Best Performance by an Actress in a TV-Series – Drama" – Northern Exposure
 1993: Nominated, "Best Performance by an Actress in a TV-Series – Drama" – Northern Exposure
 1994: Nominated, "Best Performance by an Actress in a TV-Series – Drama" – Northern Exposure
 1995: Turner Hosted 52nd Annual Golden Globe Awards

Screen Actors Guild Awards
 1995: Nominated, "Outstanding Performance by an Ensemble in a Comedy Series" – Northern Exposure

Young Artist Award
 1983: Won, "Best Young Actress in the Daytime Series" – General Hospital

Bibliography
 Holding Her Head High: Inspiration from 12 Single Mothers Who Championed Their Children and Changed History. Nashville, Tennessee: Thomas Nelson, 2008.

References

External links
 
 
 

1962 births
Living people
Actresses from Texas
Female models from Nebraska
American conservative talk radio hosts
American film actresses
American television actresses
American soap opera actresses
American political commentators
American political writers
American libertarians
People from Euless, Texas
Actors from Lincoln, Nebraska
Texas Republicans
Radio personalities from Dallas
The Washington Times people
Journalists from Texas
20th-century American actresses
21st-century American actresses